is a manga by Yamanaka Akira. It ran in the children's magazine, Comic BomBom, from November 9, 2004 to May 11, 2005. The manga is not connected to Ryoichi Ikegami's Spider-Man: The Manga.

Plot
In the year 200X, a supervillain who goes by the name Lord Gokibu wants to steal the fossil of the Insect King, 15 year-old Sho Amano uses his new spider powers to become Spider-Man J, to prevent this from happening. During his time as a superhero, he meets Japanese versions of Elektra, Dr. Doom, Blade, and the Fantastic Four.

Characters
 is a 15-year-old boy with the paranormal abilities of a spider. He keeps his identity as Spider-Man J a secret, fearing his family or friends might get hurt. The only person who knows Sho is Spider-Man J is Detective Makoto. He specializes in a number of weapons that he creates using his web-shooters. He is shy and clumsy, and barely has any friends. He has 3 pets, a cat named Leo, a dog named Par, and a bird named Don, a nod to Toei's Spider-Man Show, where Spider-Man had a giant robot named Leopardon. In the English version, he is known as Peter Parker.

 is a detective who became a cop because he wanted to protect people. He has a goofy sense of humor, but has a good heart and believes in justice. In the English version, he is known as Detective Flynn.

 is Sho's young, happy go-lucky aunt. She loves Sho like he is her own son, and is overprotective of him. She owns her own dress shop. She is quite relaxed, and is known for her spicy curry. In the English version, she is known as Aunt May.

 is Sho Amano's classmate and girlfriend. She is a tomboy, and is very careful for everyone, especially Sho, whom she is madly in love with. In the English version, she is known as Mary Jane Watson.

 is Sho's classmate and friend. He is a fan of Spider-Man J and Comic BomBom, judging by his shirt that reads "Bom". In the English version, he is known as Harold Osborn.

 is the main villain of the manga. Not much is known about him, or his past. In the English version, he is known as Lord Beastius.

In other media
Spider-Man J is now considered canon in the Marvel Multiverse, and is designated as having taken place on Earth-7041. During the Spider-Verse crossover, Sho Amano is recruited by Peter Parker 616 along with Mangaverse Spider-Man and Takuya Yamashiro in a battle against Solus and the Inheritors.

Reception
When the manga came out in Japan, it enjoyed a loyal fanbase of otakus. The response from American fans was mixed.

Publishing
The manga was translated into English in Spider-Man Family, starting in issue 1, volume 2. and has been released also in 2 English sized tankōbon, called "Digests" by Marvel Comics. The first volume was called "Japanese Knights" and the second was called "Japanese Daze".

See also

Japanese Spider-Man

References

2004 manga
Alternative versions of Spider-Man
Children's manga
Kodansha manga
Manga series
Spider-Man titles
Manga based on comics